Fürbringer – also occurring in the German diaspora variants Fuerbringer or Furbringer – is a surname of German origin. Its literal meaning is witness or more pejoratively tinged accusator or slanderer (from Middle High German vürbringer, an agent noun derived from mhg. vürbringen, which corresponds to New High German vorbringen "to say") and originally described a person who gave oral testimony before a court. In Germany the area of highest density of this family name is located in the eastern part of the Bavarian region of Upper Franconia and in the neighboring Vogtland to the north.

Notable people with the surname include:

 Ernst Fritz Fürbringer (1900–1988), German film actor
Ludwig Fuerbringer (1864–1947), American Lutheran minister
 Matt Fuerbringer  (born 1974), American beach volleyball player

 Max Fürbringer (1846–1920), German anatomist
 Otto Fuerbringer (1910–2008), American magazine editor
 Paul Fürbringer (1849–1930), German physician and chemist
 Werner Fürbringer (1888–1982), German U-boat commander and counter admiral

References

German-language surnames